Michael David Haynes (born December 24, 1965) is a former American football wide receiver in the National Football League. He was drafted by the Atlanta Falcons in the seventh round of the 1988 NFL Draft. He played college football at Northern Arizona after attending Eastern Arizona College. Haynes also played for the New Orleans Saints.

Professional career
The Atlanta Falcon selected Haynes in the seventh round (166th overall) of the 1988 NFL Draft. Haynes was the 16th wide receiver drafted in 1988.

On September 11, 1988, Haynes made his professional regular season debut and made his first reception on a 12-yard pass by Chris Miller as the Falcons lost 29-21 against the New Orleans Saints. On October 30, 1988, Haynes made his first career touchdown reception on a 19-yard pass by Chris Miller during the second quarter of a 27-24 victory at the Philadelphia Eagles in Week 9. He finished the game with two receptions for 68 receiving yards and two touchdowns receptions. He finished his rookie season in 1988 with 13 receptions for 232 receiving yards and four touchdown receptions in 15 games.

References

1965 births
Living people
American football wide receivers
Atlanta Falcons players
New Orleans Saints players
Northern Arizona Lumberjacks football players
Players of American football from New Orleans